Bingu National Stadium in Lilongwe is the national stadium of Malawi. It is used for football matches and also has an athletics track. It hosts the home games of the Malawi national football team. It holds 41,100 people. It is named after former Malawian president Bingu wa Mutharika. 
This stadium became Ethiopian Football Federation home arena. This follows Ethiopian Football Federation request to CAF to use BNS as their national stadium is banned to host international matches for lacking minimum requirements as per the CAF Club Licensing criteria.

Construction 
The stadium was built with a US$70 million price tag and opened in 2017.

References  

Football venues in Malawi
Athletics (track and field) venues in Malawi
Sports venues in Malawi
Malawi
2015 establishments in Malawi